The 1955 Philadelphia Phillies season was a season in American baseball. It was the first season for Phillies' manager Mayo Smith. Prior to the season, the Phillies were seen to have strong pitching with ace Robin Roberts but did not have power hitters to match pennant favorites Brooklyn, New York, or Milwaukee, behind whom the Phillies finished in fourth place with a record of 77-77.

Offseason 
Prior to the 1955 season, the Phillies purchased the  Ballantine Beer electronic scoreboard from Yankee Stadium for $175,000 from the Yankees. It was placed in right-center field at Connie Mack Stadium. This scoreboard was used through the final year at the ballpark.

Spring training 
In March 1955, the Phillies began spring training play at Clearwater's Jack Russell Stadium. The stadium was dedicated on March 10, 1955. Baseball Commissioner Ford Frick, National League president Warren Giles, American League president Will Harridge, Clearwater mayor Herbert M. Brown, and other city dignitaries were in attendance. The Phillies played their first game at the stadium on the day of the dedication. Robin Roberts started for the Phillies against the Detroit Tigers. The Phillies won 4–2 on a two-run double by Willie Jones before 4,209 attendees.

Notable transactions 
 February 11, 1955: Peanuts Lowrey was signed as a free agent by the Phillies.
 February 19, 1955: Jimmie Coker was signed as an amateur free agent by the Phillies.
 Prior to 1955 season: Ed Bouchee was purchased by the Phillies from the Spokane Indians.

Regular season

Season standings

Record vs. opponents

Notable transactions 
 April 30, 1955: Smoky Burgess, Stan Palys and Steve Ridzik were traded by the Phillies to the Cincinnati Redlegs for Andy Seminick, Glen Gorbous, and Jim Greengrass.

Game log

|- style="background:#bbb"
| – || April 12 || Giants || colspan=6 | Postponed (rain); Makeup: May 25 as a traditional double-header
|- style="background:#bfb"
| 1 || April 13 || Giants || 4–2 || Robin Roberts (1–0) || Johnny Antonelli (0–1) || None || 13,219 || 1–0
|- style="background:#bfb"
| 2 || April 14 || @ Pirates || 4–3 || Herm Wehmeier (1–0) || Dick Littlefield (0–1) || None || 23,540 || 2–0
|- style="background:#bbb"
| – || April 15 || @ Pirates || colspan=6 | Postponed (rain, wet grounds); Makeup: May 29 as a traditional double-header
|- style="background:#fbb"
| 3 || April 16 || @ Giants || 3–8 || Jim Hearn (1–0) || Jack Meyer (0–1) || None || 11,163 || 2–1
|- style="background:#bfb"
| 4 || April 17 (1) || @ Giants || 4–2 (11) || Robin Roberts (2–0) || Johnny Antonelli (0–2) || None || see 2nd game || 3–1
|- style="background:#bfb"
| 5 || April 17 (2) || @ Giants || 4–2 || Murry Dickson (1–0) || Sal Maglie (0–2) || None || 16,166 || 4–1
|- style="background:#fbb"
| 6 || April 18 || Dodgers || 2–5 || Carl Erskine (2–0) || Herm Wehmeier (1–1) || Ed Roebuck (1) || 30,896 || 4–2
|- style="background:#fbb"
| 7 || April 19 || Dodgers || 6–7 || Don Newcombe (2–0) || Jim Owens (0–1) || Ed Roebuck (2) || 19,930 || 4–3
|- style="background:#fbb"
| 8 || April 20 || @ Dodgers || 2–3 || Billy Loes (2–0) || Steve Ridzik (0–1) || Clem Labine (1) || 9,942 || 4–4
|- style="background:#fbb"
| 9 || April 21 || @ Dodgers || 4–14 || Joe Black (1–0) || Robin Roberts (2–1) || None || 3,874 || 4–5
|- style="background:#bfb"
| 10 || April 22 || Pirates || 5–4 || Bob Miller (1–0) || Roger Bowman (0–1) || None || 5,821 || 5–5
|- style="background:#bfb"
| 11 || April 23 || Pirates || 8–0 || Murry Dickson (2–0) || Ron Kline (0–2) || None || 4,132 || 6–5
|- style="background:#fbb"
| 12 || April 24 (1) || Pirates || 1–6 || Max Surkont (1–2) || Jim Owens (0–2) || None || see 2nd game || 6–6
|- style="background:#bfb"
| 13 || April 24 (2) || Pirates || 3–0 || Jack Meyer (1–1) || Nellie King (0–1) || Robin Roberts (1) || 8,224 || 7–6
|- style="background:#bbb"
| – || April 26 || Cardinals || colspan=6 | Postponed (wet grounds); Makeup: July 22 as a traditional double-header
|- style="background:#bfb"
| 14 || April 28 || Braves || 3–2 || Robin Roberts (3–1) || Lew Burdette (2–1) || None || 12,963 || 8–6
|- style="background:#bfb"
| 15 || April 29 || Braves || 13–4 (8) || Herm Wehmeier (2–1) || Warren Spahn (2–2) || None || 12,146 || 9–6
|- style="background:#fbb"
| 16 || April 30 || Braves || 2–4 || Chet Nichols (2–0) || Murry Dickson (2–1) || Humberto Robinson (2) || 7,739 || 9–7
|-

|- style="background:#fbb"
| 17 || May 1 (1) || Cubs || 7–8 || Hal Jeffcoat (2–0) || Lynn Lovenguth (0–1) || Bubba Church (1) || see 2nd game || 9–8
|- style="background:#fbb"
| 18 || May 1 (2) || Cubs || 2–4 || Hal Jeffcoat (3–0) || Jack Meyer (1–2) || Warren Hacker (1) || 13,917 || 9–9
|- style="background:#fbb"
| 19 || May 2 || Cubs || 1–2 || Warren Hacker (1–1) || Robin Roberts (3–2) || None || 7,964 || 9–10
|- style="background:#fbb"
| 20 || May 3 || Redlegs || 5–7 || Bud Podbielan (1–0) || Jack Spring (0–1) || None || 6,029 || 9–11
|- style="background:#fbb"
| 21 || May 4 || Redlegs || 3–7 || Gerry Staley (3–2) || Ron Mrozinski (0–1) || Art Fowler (1) || 5,531 || 9–12
|- style="background:#fbb"
| 22 || May 6 || Dodgers || 4–6 (12) || Don Newcombe (3–0) || Jack Meyer (1–3) || None || 22,420 || 9–13
|- style="background:#fbb"
| 23 || May 7 || Dodgers || 3–6 || Carl Erskine (5–0) || Robin Roberts (3–3) || None || 27,922 || 9–14
|- style="background:#fbb"
| 24 || May 8 || Dodgers || 8–9 || Johnny Podres (3–1) || Herm Wehmeier (2–2) || Jim Hughes (4) || 13,738 || 9–15
|- style="background:#fbb"
| 25 || May 10 || @ Cardinals || 3–5 (10) || Luis Arroyo (2–0) || Jack Meyer (1–4) || None || 4,693 || 9–16
|- style="background:#fbb"
| 26 || May 11 || @ Cardinals || 5–6 || Herb Moford (1–0) || Ron Mrozinski (0–2) || Barney Schultz (1) || 4,726 || 9–17
|- style="background:#bbb"
| – || May 12 || @ Redlegs || colspan=6 | Postponed (rain); Makeup: June 24 as a traditional double-header
|- style="background:#bbb"
| – || May 13 || @ Redlegs || colspan=6 | Postponed (rain, threatening weather, wet grounds); Makeup: August 2 as a traditional double-header
|- style="background:#fbb"
| 27 || May 14 || @ Braves || 4–5 || Ernie Johnson (1–1) || Jack Meyer (1–5) || None || 24,862 || 9–18
|- style="background:#fbb"
| 28 || May 15 (1) || @ Braves || 5–6 || Dave Jolly (1–2) || Thornton Kipper (0–1) || None || see 2nd game || 9–19
|- style="background:#bfb"
| 29 || May 15 (2) || @ Braves || 9–1 || Robin Roberts (4–3) || Chet Nichols (3–1) || None || 42,351 || 10–19
|- style="background:#bbb"
| – || May 17 || @ Cubs || colspan=6 | Postponed (cold); Makeup: May 18 as a traditional double-header
|- style="background:#fbb"
| 30 || May 18 (1) || @ Cubs || 2–3 || Sam Jones (5–3) || Curt Simmons (0–1) || Hal Jeffcoat (2) || see 2nd game || 10–20
|- style="background:#fbb"
| 31 || May 18 (2) || @ Cubs || 5–7 || Hal Jeffcoat (4–0) || Murry Dickson (2–2) || None || 9,329 || 10–21
|- style="background:#bfb"
| 32 || May 20 || @ Dodgers || 5–3 || Robin Roberts (5–3) || Billy Loes (4–2) || None || 21,355 || 11–21
|- style="background:#fbb"
| 33 || May 21 || @ Dodgers || 4–6 || Don Newcombe (6–0) || Dave Cole (0–1) || Ed Roebuck (4) || 13,401 || 11–22
|- style="background:#fbb"
| 34 || May 22 || @ Dodgers || 3–8 || Carl Erskine (6–1) || Jack Meyer (1–6) || Ed Roebuck (5) || 15,459 || 11–23
|- style="background:#bfb"
| 35 || May 24 || Giants || 6–2 || Curt Simmons (1–1) || Jim Hearn (6–3) || Jack Meyer (1) || 15,008 || 12–23
|- style="background:#bfb"
| 36 || May 25 (1) || Giants || 8–3 || Robin Roberts (6–3) || Windy McCall (1–1) || None || see 2nd game || 13–23
|- style="background:#bfb"
| 37 || May 25 (2) || Giants || 5–2 || Murry Dickson (3–2) || Johnny Antonelli (4–5) || Jack Meyer (2) || 27,420 || 14–23
|- style="background:#bfb"
| 38 || May 26 || Giants || 3–2 (11) || Bob Miller (2–0) || Hoyt Wilhelm (2–1) || None || 11,743 || 15–23
|- style="background:#bfb"
| 39 || May 27 || @ Pirates || 5–2 (10) || Herm Wehmeier (3–2) || Bob Friend (2–1) || None || 6,956 || 16–23
|- style="background:#bfb"
| 40 || May 28 || @ Pirates || 8–4 (11) || Bob Miller (3–0) || Roy Face (0–1) || Jack Meyer (3) || 3,082 || 17–23
|- style="background:#bfb"
| 41 || May 29 (1) || @ Pirates || 5–2 || Robin Roberts (7–3) || Laurin Pepper (0–1) || None || see 2nd game || 18–23
|- style="background:#fbb"
| 42 || May 29 (2) || @ Pirates || 5–11 || Max Surkont (4–5) || Dave Cole (0–2) || None || 5,918 || 18–24
|- style="background:#fbb"
| 43 || May 30 (1) || @ Giants || 5–6 || Marv Grissom (2–0) || Curt Simmons (1–2) || Windy McCall (1) || see 2nd game || 18–25
|- style="background:#bfb"
| 44 || May 30 (2) || @ Giants || 3–1 || Bob Kuzava (1–1) || Don Liddle (1–2) || Jack Meyer (4) || 20,044 || 19–25
|- style="background:#fbb"
| 45 || May 31 || @ Giants || 1–2 || Sal Maglie (6–3) || Herm Wehmeier (3–3) || None || 6,746 || 19–26
|-

|- style="background:#bfb"
| 46 || June 1 || Cubs || 3–1 || Robin Roberts (8–3) || Sam Jones (5–6) || None || 19,974 || 20–26
|- style="background:#bfb"
| 47 || June 2 || Cubs || 8–4 || Curt Simmons (2–2) || Warren Hacker (4–3) || Bob Miller (1) || 6,084 || 21–26
|- style="background:#fbb"
| 48 || June 3 || Braves || 3–4 (10) || Lew Burdette (3–4) || Murry Dickson (3–3) || None || 16,362 || 21–27
|- style="background:#fbb"
| 49 || June 4 || Braves || 3–11 || Warren Spahn (4–6) || Bob Miller (3–1) || None || 6,465 || 21–28
|- style="background:#fbb"
| 50 || June 5 (1) || Braves || 4–5 || Ernie Johnson (2–2) || Robin Roberts (8–4) || None || see 2nd game || 21–29
|- style="background:#bfb"
| 51 || June 5 (2) || Braves || 4–2 || Herm Wehmeier (4–3) || Gene Conley (7–3) || Jack Meyer (5) || 23,431 || 22–29
|- style="background:#fbb"
| 52 || June 6 || Braves || 2–5 || Bob Buhl (2–4) || Dave Cole (0–3) || None || 11,815 || 22–30
|- style="background:#fbb"
| 53 || June 7 || Cardinals || 4–5 || Harvey Haddix (3–8) || Murry Dickson (3–4) || Frank Smith (1) || 9,782 || 22–31
|- style="background:#bbb"
| – || June 8 || Cardinals || colspan=6 | Postponed (rain); Makeup: August 25 as a traditional double-header
|- style="background:#bfb"
| 54 || June 9 || Cardinals || 2–0 || Robin Roberts (9–4) || Larry Jackson (2–3) || None || 5,668 || 23–31
|- style="background:#bbb"
| – || June 11 || Redlegs || colspan=6 | Postponed (rain); Makeup: July 19 as a traditional double-header
|- style="background:#bfb"
| 55 || June 12 (1) || Redlegs || 12–8 || Curt Simmons (3–2) || Joe Nuxhall (5–4) || None || 13,067 || 24–31
|- style="background:#bbb"
| – || June 12 (2) || Redlegs || colspan=6 | Postponed (rain); Makeup: July 20 as a traditional double-header
|- style="background:#fbb"
| 56 || June 14 || @ Braves || 2–4 || Lew Burdette (4–4) || Robin Roberts (9–5) || None || 29,252 || 24–32
|- style="background:#bfb"
| 57 || June 15 || @ Braves || 4–0 || Herm Wehmeier (5–3) || Gene Conley (8–4) || None || 27,759 || 25–32
|- style="background:#bfb"
| 58 || June 16 || @ Braves || 3–0 || Murry Dickson (4–4) || Bob Buhl (3–5) || None || 17,978 || 26–32
|- style="background:#bfb"
| 59 || June 17 || @ Cubs || 3–2 || Curt Simmons (4–2) || Bob Rush (4–4) || None || 6,575 || 27–32
|- style="background:#fbb"
| 60 || June 18 || @ Cubs || 0–4 || Sam Jones (7–8) || Robin Roberts (9–6) || None || 16,543 || 27–33
|- style="background:#bfb"
| 61 || June 19 (1) || @ Cubs || 1–0 (15) || Jack Meyer (2–6) || Hal Jeffcoat (6–1) || None || see 2nd game || 28–33
|- style="background:#fbb"
| 62 || June 19 (2) || @ Cubs || 7–8 (7) || Howie Pollet (3–0) || Herm Wehmeier (5–4) || Warren Hacker (2) || 34,529 || 28–34
|- style="background:#fbb"
| 63 || June 20 || @ Cardinals || 1–4 || Luis Arroyo (8–2) || Murry Dickson (4–5) || None || 7,284 || 28–35
|- style="background:#bfb"
| 64 || June 21 || @ Cardinals || 10–8 || Murry Dickson (5–5) || Paul LaPalme (3–1) || Ron Mrozinski (1) || 7,717 || 29–35
|- style="background:#bfb"
| 65 || June 22 || @ Cardinals || 9–6 || Robin Roberts (10–6) || Bobby Tiefenauer (1–4) || None || 7,445 || 30–35
|- style="background:#fbb"
| 66 || June 23 || @ Cardinals || 1–7 || Floyd Wooldridge (1–1) || Herm Wehmeier (5–5) || None || 6,430 || 30–36
|- style="background:#bfb"
| 67 || June 24 (1) || @ Redlegs || 8–6 || Ron Negray (1–0) || Rudy Minarcin (4–3) || Jack Meyer (6) || see 2nd game || 31–36
|- style="background:#fbb"
| 68 || June 24 (2) || @ Redlegs || 0–6 || Joe Nuxhall (7–4) || Murry Dickson (5–6) || None || 18,326 || 31–37
|- style="background:#bbb"
| – || June 25 || @ Redlegs || colspan=6 | Postponed (rain); Makeup: August 1
|- style="background:#fbb"
| 69 || June 26 (1) || @ Redlegs || 5–16 || Jackie Collum (6–2) || Robin Roberts (10–7) || Hersh Freeman (3) || see 2nd game || 31–38
|- style="background:#fbb"
| 70 || June 26 (2) || @ Redlegs || 0–5 || Art Fowler (3–4) || Curt Simmons (4–3) || None || 16,897 || 31–39
|- style="background:#fbb"
| 71 || June 28 || Pirates || 5–7 (10) || Bob Friend (5–4) || Jack Meyer (2–7) || Roy Face (3) || 8,635 || 31–40
|- style="background:#bfb"
| 72 || June 29 || Pirates || 6–3 || Ron Negray (2–0) || Dick Littlefield (2–6) || None || 4,919 || 32–40
|-

|- style="background:#bfb"
| 73 || July 1 || Giants || 9–3 || Robin Roberts (11–7) || Johnny Antonelli (6–10) || None || 14,135 || 33–40
|- style="background:#fbb"
| 74 || July 2 || Giants || 1–6 || Sal Maglie (9–4) || Curt Simmons (4–4) || Don Liddle (1) || 6,542 || 33–41
|- style="background:#fbb"
| 75 || July 3 || Giants || 3–4 || Rubén Gómez (6–3) || Bob Miller (3–2) || None || 8,259 || 33–42
|- style="background:#fbb"
| 76 || July 4 (1) || Dodgers || 2–11 || Don Newcombe (14–1) || Ron Negray (2–1) || None || see 2nd game || 33–43
|- style="background:#fbb"
| 77 || July 4 (2) || Dodgers || 3–6 || Clem Labine (7–2) || Herm Wehmeier (5–6) || None || 33,707 || 33–44
|- style="background:#bfb"
| 78 || July 5 || Dodgers || 5–4 || Robin Roberts (12–7) || Karl Spooner (2–2) || Jack Meyer (7) || 21,041 || 34–44
|- style="background:#fbb"
| 79 || July 6 || @ Giants || 2–4 (6) || Ramón Monzant (1–4) || Curt Simmons (4–5) || None || 8,845 || 34–45
|- style="background:#fbb"
| 80 || July 7 || @ Giants || 5–8 || Windy McCall (3–3) || Jack Meyer (2–8) || Marv Grissom (7) || 5,130 || 34–46
|- style="background:#bfb"
| 81 || July 8 || @ Pirates || 5–1 || Herm Wehmeier (6–6) || Max Surkont (7–9) || None || 7,304 || 35–46
|- style="background:#bfb"
| 82 || July 9 || @ Pirates || 7–1 || Robin Roberts (13–7) || Dick Littlefield (2–7) || None || 2,637 || 36–46
|- style="background:#bfb"
| 83 || July 10 (1) || @ Pirates || 4–1 || Curt Simmons (5–5) || Bob Friend (5–5) || None || see 2nd game || 37–46
|- style="background:#fbb"
| 84 || July 10 (2) || @ Pirates || 1–3 || Vern Law (6–3) || Ron Negray (2–2) || None || 6,454 || 37–47
|- style="background:#bbcaff;"
| – || July 12 ||colspan="7" |1955 Major League Baseball All-Star Game at Milwaukee County Stadium in Milwaukee
|- style="background:#fbb"
| 85 || July 14 || Braves || 1–7 || Bob Buhl (7–7) || Herm Wehmeier (6–7) || None || 16,728 || 37–48
|- style="background:#bfb"
| 86 || July 15 || Braves || 1–0 || Murry Dickson (6–6) || Lew Burdette (7–5) || None || 11,794 || 38–48
|- style="background:#bfb"
| 87 || July 16 || Cubs || 39–48 || Robin Roberts (14–7) || Warren Hacker (9–7) || None || 5,241 || 39–48
|- style="background:#bfb"
| 88 || July 17 (1) || Cubs || 12–11 (10) || Jack Meyer (3–8) || Sam Jones (9–12) || None || see 2nd game || 40–48
|- style="background:#bfb"
| 89 || July 17 (2) || Cubs || 8–6 || Ron Negray (3–2) || Hal Jeffcoat (6–4) || Jack Meyer (8) || 8,513 || 41–48
|- style="background:#bfb"
| 90 || July 18 || Cubs || 2–1 || Herm Wehmeier (7–7) || Warren Hacker (9–8) || None || 8,192 || 42–48
|- style="background:#bfb"
| 91 || July 19 (1) || Redlegs || 7–3 || Murry Dickson (7–6) || Joe Nuxhall (9–7) || None || see 2nd game || 43–48
|- style="background:#bfb"
| 92 || July 19 (2) || Redlegs || 6–2 || Robin Roberts (15–7) || Jackie Collum (8–4) || None || 16,960 || 44–48
|- style="background:#bfb"
| 93 || July 20 (1) || Redlegs || 6–0 || Saul Rogovin (2–8) || Art Fowler (4–6) || None || see 2nd game || 45–48
|- style="background:#bfb"
| 94 || July 20 (2) || Redlegs || 4–2 || Curt Simmons (6–5) || Johnny Klippstein (1–6) || None || 15,607 || 46–48
|- style="background:#bfb"
| 95 || July 21 || Redlegs || 5–3 || Jack Meyer (4–8) || Gerry Staley (5–7) || None || 8,036 || 47–48
|- style="background:#bfb"
| 96 || July 22 (1) || Cardinals || 6–3 || Murry Dickson (8–6) || Floyd Wooldridge (2–3) || None || see 2nd game || 48–48
|- style="background:#fbb"
| 97 || July 22 (2) || Cardinals || 1–8 || Harvey Haddix (8–9) || Herm Wehmeier (7–8) || None || 27,611 || 48–49
|- style="background:#bfb"
| 98 || July 23 || Cardinals || 7–2 || Robin Roberts (16–7) || Willard Schmidt (1–1) || None || 5,596 || 49–49
|- style="background:#bfb"
| 99 || July 24 (1) || Cardinals || 6–5 || Curt Simmons (7–5) || Larry Jackson (5–7) || Jack Meyer (9) || see 2nd game || 50–49
|- style="background:#bfb"
| 100 || July 24 (2) || Cardinals || 3–0 (6) || Saul Rogovin (3–8) || Tom Poholsky (4–5) || None || 13,524 || 51–49
|- style="background:#fbb"
| 101 || July 26 || @ Braves || 3–6 || Warren Spahn (9–10) || Herm Wehmeier (7–9) || None || 29,534 || 51–50
|- style="background:#fbb"
| 102 || July 27 || @ Braves || 1–2 || Lew Burdette (8–5) || Robin Roberts (16–8) || Ernie Johnson (2) || 25,936 || 51–51
|- style="background:#fbb"
| 103 || July 28 || @ Braves || 2–4 || Bob Buhl (8–7) || Murry Dickson (8–7) || None || 22,335 || 51–52
|- style="background:#bfb"
| 104 || July 29 || @ Cubs || 6–4 || Jack Meyer (5–8) || Sam Jones (9–15) || Robin Roberts (2) || 4,271 || 52–52
|- style="background:#bfb"
| 105 || July 30 || @ Cubs || 3–0 || Bob Miller (4–2) || Jim Davis (5–6) || None || 8,405 || 53–52
|- style="background:#fbb"
| 106 || July 31 (1) || @ Cubs || 1–7 || Warren Hacker (10–9) || Robin Roberts (16–9) || None || see 2nd game || 53–53
|- style="background:#fbb"
| 107 || July 31 (2) || @ Cubs || 5–6 || Hal Jeffcoat (7–5) || Jack Meyer (5–9) || None || 14,469 || 53–54
|-

|- style="background:#fbb"
| 108 || August 1 || @ Redlegs || 3–4 || Art Fowler (6–7) || Murry Dickson (8–8) || Hersh Freeman (7) || 3,481 || 53–55
|- style="background:#fbb"
| 109 || August 2 (1) || @ Redlegs || 0–2 || Johnny Klippstein (3–6) || Ron Negray (3–3) || None || see 2nd game || 53–56
|- style="background:#fbb"
| 110 || August 2 (2) || @ Redlegs || 0–4 || Joe Nuxhall (11–8) || Saul Rogovin (3–9) || None || 10,611 || 53–57
|- style="background:#bfb"
| 111 || August 3 || @ Redlegs || 8–4 || Robin Roberts (17–9) || Jackie Collum (9–6) || None || 7,718 || 54–57
|- style="background:#fbb"
| 112 || August 4 || @ Redlegs || 3–4 || Rudy Minarcin (5–9) || Jack Meyer (5–10) || Joe Nuxhall (2) || 2,793 || 54–58
|- style="background:#bfb"
| 113 || August 5 || @ Cardinals || 7–4 || Bob Miller (5–2) || Larry Jackson (5–9) || Jack Meyer (10) || 8,455 || 55–58
|- style="background:#bfb"
| 114 || August 6 || @ Cardinals || 5–3 || Murry Dickson (9–8) || Harvey Haddix (9–11) || None || 9,414 || 56–58
|- style="background:#bfb"
| 115 || August 7 || @ Cardinals || 9–6 || Robin Roberts (18–9) || Mel Wright (1–1) || Jack Meyer (11) || 7,917 || 57–58
|- style="background:#bfb"
| 116 || August 9 || Pirates || 9–1 || Herm Wehmeier (8–9) || Dick Hall (3–2) || None || 9,347 || 58–58
|- style="background:#fbb"
| 117 || August 10 || Pirates || 2–3 (10) || Bob Friend (9–6) || Bob Miller (5–3) || None || 3,922 || 58–59
|- style="background:#bbb"
| – || August 12 || @ Dodgers || colspan=6 | Postponed (rain; Hurricane Connie); Makeup: August 14 as a traditional double-header
|- style="background:#bbb"
| – || August 13 || @ Dodgers || colspan=6 | Postponed (rain; Hurricane Connie); Makeup: September 20 as a traditional double-header
|- style="background:#bfb"
| 118 || August 14 (1) || @ Dodgers || 3–2 (10) || Robin Roberts (19–9) || Don Newcombe (18–3) || None || see 2nd game || 59–59
|- style="background:#fbb"
| 119 || August 14 (2) || @ Dodgers || 4–5 (13) || Karl Spooner (5–4) || Bob Miller (5–4) || None || 21,344 || 59–60
|- style="background:#bfb"
| 120 || August 16 || @ Pirates || 12–3 || Herm Wehmeier (9–9) || Bob Friend (9–7) || None || 6,290 || 60–60
|- style="background:#fbb"
| 121 || August 17 || @ Pirates || 4–6 || Roy Face (3–5) || Curt Simmons (7–6) || None || 3,721 || 60–61
|- style="background:#bfb"
| 122 || August 19 || Dodgers || 3–2 || Robin Roberts (20–9) || Don Newcombe (18–4) || None || 35,444 || 61–61
|- style="background:#bfb"
| 123 || August 20 || Dodgers || 3–2 || Bob Miller (6–4) || Johnny Podres (8–8) || Robin Roberts (3) || 25,390 || 62–61
|- style="background:#bfb"
| 124 || August 21 || Dodgers || 6–4 || Herm Wehmeier (10–9) || Carl Erskine (10–5) || Jack Meyer (12) || 17,492 || 63–61
|- style="background:#bfb"
| 125 || August 23 || Braves || 4–3 || Jack Meyer (6–10) || Lew Burdette (9–7) || None || 23,991 || 64–61
|- style="background:#bfb"
| 126 || August 25 (1) || Cardinals || 11–9 || Robin Roberts (21–9) || Paul LaPalme (4–3) || Jack Meyer (13) || see 2nd game || 65–61
|- style="background:#bfb"
| 127 || August 25 (2) || Cardinals || 8–3 || Saul Rogovin (4–9) || Harvey Haddix (11–13) || None || 38,545 || 66–61
|- style="background:#fbb"
| 128 || August 26 || Cardinals || 1–4 || Willard Schmidt (4–3) || Curt Simmons (7–7) || None || 11,387 || 66–62
|- style="background:#bfb"
| 129 || August 27 || Cardinals || 8–2 || Murry Dickson (10–8) || Luis Arroyo (11–8) || None || 6,822 || 67–62
|- style="background:#bfb"
| 130 || August 28 (1) || Redlegs || 7–6 || Bob Miller (7–4) || Joe Nuxhall (14–10) || Jack Meyer (14) || see 2nd game || 68–62
|- style="background:#bfb"
| 131 || August 28 (2) || Redlegs || 8–3 || Ron Negray (4–3) || Jackie Collum (9–8) || None || 19,067 || 69–62
|- style="background:#fbb"
| 132 || August 29 || Redlegs || 3–4 || Hersh Freeman (6–3) || Robin Roberts (21–10) || None || 17,134 || 69–63
|- style="background:#fbb"
| 133 || August 30 || Cubs || 1–3 || Sam Jones (12–17) || Saul Rogovin (4–10) || Hal Jeffcoat (6) || 9,790 || 69–64
|- style="background:#bfb"
| 134 || August 31 || Cubs || 13–2 || Murry Dickson (11–8) || Jim Davis (6–10) || None || 8,018 || 70–64
|-

|- style="background:#bfb"
| 135 || September 2 || Giants || 5–3 || Robin Roberts (22–10) || Windy McCall (5–5) || Jack Meyer (15) || 19,997 || 71–64
|- style="background:#fbb"
| 136 || September 3 || Giants || 2–3 || Ramón Monzant (3–7) || Herm Wehmeier (10–10) || None || 23,179 || 71–65
|- style="background:#fbb"
| 137 || September 4 || Giants || 4–7 || Hoyt Wilhelm (3–1) || Jack Meyer (6–11) || Marv Grissom (8) || 16,197 || 71–66
|- style="background:#fbb"
| 138 || September 5 (1) || @ Dodgers || 4–11 || Don Newcombe (20–4) || Murry Dickson (11–9) || None || see 2nd game || 71–67
|- style="background:#fbb"
| 139 || September 5 (2) || @ Dodgers || 2–8 || Carl Erskine (11–7) || Robin Roberts (22–11) || None || 33,451 || 71–68
|- style="background:#fbb"
| 140 || September 7 || @ Redlegs || 3–6 || Johnny Klippstein (7–9) || Curt Simmons (7–8) || None || 6,888 || 71–69
|- style="background:#bfb"
| 141 || September 8 || @ Redlegs || 6–4 || Bob Miller (8–4) || Don Gross (3–5) || None || 1,531 || 72–69
|- style="background:#fbb"
| 142 || September 9 || @ Cardinals || 2–11 || Willard Schmidt (5–5) || Murry Dickson (11–10) || None || 5,932 || 72–70
|- style="background:#fbb"
| 143 || September 10 || @ Cardinals || 3–4 (6) || Tom Poholsky (8–10) || Robin Roberts (22–12) || None || 4,471 || 72–71
|- style="background:#fbb"
| 144 || September 11 (1) || @ Braves || 4–5 || Ernie Johnson (5–6) || Herm Wehmeier (10–11) || None || see 2nd game || 72–72
|- style="background:#fbb"
| 145 || September 11 (2) || @ Braves || 1–9 || Humberto Robinson (3–0) || Saul Rogovin (4–11) || None || 26,426 || 72–73
|- style="background:#bfb"
| 146 || September 13 || @ Cubs || 10–0 || Murry Dickson (12–10) || Sam Jones (13–19) || None || 1,785 || 73–73
|- style="background:#bfb"
| 147 || September 16 || Pirates || 8–1 || Robin Roberts (23–12) || Max Surkont (7–13) || None || 10,023 || 74–73
|- style="background:#fbb"
| 148 || September 18 (1) || Pirates || 2–5 || Bob Friend (13–9) || Herm Wehmeier (10–12) || Roy Face (5) || see 2nd game || 74–74
|- style="background:#bfb"
| 149 || September 18 (2) || Pirates || 2–1 || Saul Rogovin (5–11) || Dick Hall (5–6) || None || 12,683 || 75–74
|- style="background:#fbb"
| 150 || September 20 (1) || @ Dodgers || 3–6 || Clem Labine (13–5) || Murry Dickson (12–11) || Don Bessent (3) || see 2nd game || 75–75
|- style="background:#fbb"
| 151 || September 20 (2) || @ Dodgers || 1–6 || Roger Craig (5–3) || Robin Roberts (23–13) || None || 8,763 || 75–76
|- style="background:#bfb"
| 152 || September 23 || @ Giants || 5–1 || Saul Rogovin (6–11) || Rubén Gómez (9–10) || None || 1,154 || 76–76
|- style="background:#bbb"
| – || September 24 || @ Giants || colspan=6 | Postponed (rain); Makeup: September 25 as a traditional double-header
|- style="background:#fbb"
| 153 || September 25 (1) || @ Giants || 2–5 || Pete Burnside (1–0) || Robin Roberts (23–14) || None || see 2nd game || 76–77
|- style="background:#bfb"
| 154 || September 25 (2) || @ Giants || 3–1 || Curt Simmons (8–8) || Jim Hearn (14–16) || Jack Meyer (16) || 6,848 || 77–77
|-

| style="text-align:left;" |
The second game on April 24 was suspended (Sunday curfew) in the bottom of the eighth inning with the score 2–0 and was completed June 28, 1955.
The second game on May 1 was suspended (Sunday curfew) in the bottom of the ninth inning with the score 2–4 and was completed May 2, 1955.
The second game on May 29 was suspended (Sunday curfew) in the bottom of the seventh inning with the score 3–8 and was completed July 8, 1955.
The second game on June 5 was suspended (Sunday curfew) in the bottom of the seventh inning with the score 4–0 and was completed June 6, 1955.
The second game on July 17 was suspended (Sunday curfew) in the bottom of the sixth inning with the score 4–5 and was completed July 18, 1955.

Roster

Player stats

Batting

Starters by position 
Note: Pos = Position; G = Games played; AB = At bats; H = Hits; Avg. = Batting average; HR = Home runs; RBI = Runs batted in

Other batters 
Note: G = Games played; AB = At bats; H = Hits; Avg. = Batting average; HR = Home runs; RBI = Runs batted in

Pitching

Starting pitchers 
Note: G = Games pitched; IP = Innings pitched; W = Wins; L = Losses; ERA = Earned run average; SO = Strikeouts

Other pitchers 
Note: G = Games pitched; IP = Innings pitched; W = Wins; L = Losses; ERA = Earned run average; SO = Strikeouts

Relief pitchers 
Note: G = Games pitched; W = Wins; L = Losses; SV = Saves; ERA = Earned run average; SO = Strikeouts

Awards and honors 
All-Star Game
Del Ennis, starter, outfield
Robin Roberts, starter, pitcher
Stan Lopata, reserve

Farm system

References

External links 
1955 Philadelphia Phillies season at Baseball Reference

Philadelphia Phillies seasons
Philadelphia Phillies season
Philadelphia